The following is a partial list of the "G" codes for Medical Subject Headings (MeSH), as defined by the United States National Library of Medicine (NLM).

This list continues the information at List of MeSH codes (G12). Codes following these are found at List of MeSH codes (G14). For other MeSH codes, see List of MeSH codes.

The source for this content is the set of 2006 MeSH Trees from the NLM.

– genetic phenomena

– consanguinity

– founder effect

– gene frequency
  – gene flow
  – genetic drift

– gene order

– gene pool

– genetic load

– genomic instability
  – chromosome instability
  – chromosome fragility

– genotype
  – gene dosage
  – genetic predisposition to disease
  – haplotypes
  – heterozygote
  – homozygote

– hybrid vigor

– inheritance patterns
  – anticipation, genetic
  – extrachromosomal inheritance
  – genes, mitochondrial
  – genes, dominant
  – genes, recessive
  – genes, x-linked
  – genes, y-linked
  – multifactorial inheritance
  – quantitative trait, heritable

– linkage (genetics)
  – linkage disequilibrium
  – lod score

– phenotype
  – genetic markers
  – penetrance

– phylogeny

– ploidies
  – aneuploidy
  – monosomy
  – trisomy
  – diploidy
  – haploidy
  – polyploidy

– sequence homology
  – sequence homology, amino acid
  – sequence homology, nucleic acid
  – synteny

– sex ratio

– structural homology, protein

– variation (genetics)
  – antibody diversity
  – antigenic variation
  – genetic heterogeneity
  – mutation
  – allelic imbalance
  – loss of heterozygosity
  – chromosome deletion
  – base pair mismatch
  – codon, nonsense
  – chromosome aberrations
  – aneuploidy
  – monosomy
  – trisomy
  – chimerism
  – chromosomal instability
  – chromosome fragility
  – chromosome breakage
  – chromosome deletion
  – inversion, chromosome
  – isochromosomes
  – micronuclei, chromosome-defective
  – mosaicism
  – ring chromosomes
  – sex chromosome aberrations
  – xyy karyotype
  – translocation, genetic
  – philadelphia chromosome
  – uniparental disomy
  – dna repeat expansion
  – trinucleotide repeat expansion
  – frameshift mutation
  – gene amplification
  – gene duplication
  – genomic instability
  – germline mutation
  – mutation, missense
  – point mutation
  – sequence deletion
  – chromosome deletion
  – gene deletion
  – suppression, genetic
  – polymorphism, genetic
  – polymorphism, restriction fragment length
  – polymorphism, single-stranded conformational
  – polymorphism, single nucleotide

The list continues at List of MeSH codes (G14).

G13